The following is a timeline of the history of the city of Manchester, New Hampshire, United States.

Prior to 19th century
 1722 - John Goffe settles in Old Harry's Town, in the British Province of New Hampshire.
 1723 - A cabin was built and gradually a small settlement grew up.
 1727 - Tyngstown (or “Tyng’s Township”) established.
 1736 - The first sawmill was erected. 
 1751 - Tyngstown rechartered as "Derryfield."
 1788 - Province becomes part of the State of New Hampshire.
 1796 - Derryfield Social Library founded.

19th century
 1807 - Canal built by Samuel Blodgett.
 1810
 Derryfield renamed "Manchester."
 Amoskeag Cotton & Woolen Manufacturing Company incorporated.
 1823 - Population: 761.
 1839
 Amoskeag Representative newspaper begins publication.
 First Congregational Society incorporated.
 First Baptist Church organized.
 1840 - Population: 3,235. 
 1841
 First Unitarian Church built.
 Valley Cemetery laid out.
1842 - Ann Bamford begins working in the Underground Railway
 1843 - Mennell's Circulating Library in business (approximate date).
 1844 - Manchester Athenaeum established.
 1846 - City incorporated.
 1846 - Manchester High School established.
 1849 - Manchester and Lawrence Railroad begins operating.
 1850
 Manchester Daily Mirror newspaper begins publication.
 City Missionary Society established.
 1851 - City hosts state fair.
 1852 - Manchester Gas Light Co. established.
 1854
 Manchester City Library established.
 Manchester Locomotive Works formed.
 1855 - First Presbyterian Church organized.
 1860 - Population: 8,841. 
 1863 - Union Leader newspaper begins publication.
 1869
 Hillsborough County seat relocated to Manchester from Amherst.
 Cathedral of St. Joseph founded.
 St. Joseph Cemetery in operation.
 1870
 Turnverein organized.
 Population: 23,509.
 1874 - Ash Street School built.
 1875 - Women's Aid Home organized.
 1880
 Manchester Opera House Company organized.
 Ste. Marie Church founded.
 Population: 33,592. 
 1883 - Union Publishing Co. incorporated.
 1885 - Young People's Christian Union organized.
 1886 - Devonshire Mills incorporated.
 1887
 People's Baptist Church organized.
 Novelty Advertising Co. incorporated.
 1889 - Saint Anselm College established in neighboring Goffstown.
 1890 
 Elliot Hospital founded.
 Population: 44,126.
 1891 - Swedish Baptist Church organized.
 1892
 Beech Street Grounds baseball stadium in operation.
 Sacred Heart Hospital founded.
 1893 - Stark Park dedicated.
 1894
 Manchester Children's Home organized.
 Eureka Shoe Co. incorporated.
 1895
 Manchester Historical Association established.
 Varick Park sports complex in operation.
 1897 - Weston Observatory built.
 1898
 Manchester Institute of Arts and Sciences founded.
 Manchester Camera Club organized.
 1900 - Population: 56,987.

20th century
 1906 - Strand Theatre in business in the former Opera House.
 1910
 Population: 70,063.
 Centennial celebration of city founding.
 1911 - Adath Yeshurun synagogue built.
 1912 - Empire Theater built.
 1913 - Textile Field sports stadium built.
 1914 - Palace Theatre and Public Library built.
 1922 - Manchester Central High School renamed, adding "Central".
 1923 - Manchester High School West established.
 1927 - Manchester Airport established.
 1929 - Currier Gallery of Art founded.
 1932 - New Hampshire School of Accounting and Secretarial Science (now Southern New Hampshire University) founded.
 1935 - Amoskeag Mills close.
 1942 - Grenier Army Airfield dedicated.
 1945
 State Trade School at Manchester founded.
 Utility Worker's Credit Union formed.
 1950 - Zimmerman House designed by Frank Lloyd Wright.
 1954 - WMUR begins broadcasting.
 1960 - Manchester Memorial High School opens.
 1963 - John F. Kennedy Memorial Coliseum opens.
 1964 - The Derryfield School established.
 1966 - Grenier Air Force Base closes.
 1971 - McIntyre Ski Area opens.
 1972 - Hampshire Plaza building constructed.
 1973 - Manchester Transit Authority founded.
 1974 - New Hampshire Symphony Orchestra formed.
 1977 - Mall of New Hampshire opens.
 1980 - Population: 90,936.
 1982 - Manchester School of Technology established.
 1985 - University of New Hampshire at Manchester established.
 1988 - Sister city relationship established with Taichung, Taiwan.
 1990 - Franco-American Centre founded.
 1992
 City Hall Plaza building constructed.
 Sister city relationship established with Neustadt an der Weinstraße, Germany.
 1998
 City website online (approximate date).
 Islamic Society of Greater Manchester founded.
 1999 - Robert A. Baines becomes mayor.

21st century

 2000
 Massachusetts College of Pharmacy and Health Sciences Manchester campus opens.
 Holy Family Academy established.
 2001
 Civic arena opens.
 Hippo newspaper begins publication.
 2005
 Fisher Cats Ballpark opens.
 Segway Fest held.
 2006
 Manchester Daily Express newspaper begins publication.
 Shooting of a police officer.
 2010
 Ted Gatsas becomes mayor.
 Population: 109,565.
 2018
 Joyce Craig becomes mayor.

Images

See also
 Manchester history
 List of mayors of Manchester, New Hampshire
 Neighborhoods in Manchester, New Hampshire
 National Register of Historic Places listings in Hillsborough County, New Hampshire

References

Bibliography

Published in the 19th century
 
 
 
 
 
 
 
 
 
 
 

Published in the 20th century
 
 
 
 
 
 
 
 Haebler, Peter. "Nativist Riots in Manchester: An Episode of Know-Nothingism in New Hampshire." Historical New Hampshire 39 (1985): 121-37.
  (fulltext via Open Library)
 
 Hareven, Tamara K., and Randolph Langenbach. Amoskeag: Life and work in an American factory-city (UPNE, 1995) The Amoskeag textile factory in Manchester was the largest in the world; this is the story of its workers. online

Published in the 21st century

External links

 
 Items related to Manchester, New Hampshire, various dates (via U.S. Library of Congress, Prints & Photos Division)
 Digitized annual reports of the Town of Manchester, various dates (via Internet Archive)
 Works related to Manchester, various dates (via Digital Public Library of America).

Years in New Hampshire
Manchester, New Hampshire
Manchester
Manchester
manchester